Idiochlora is a genus of moths in the family Geometridae. The genus was described by Warren in 1896.

Species
Idiochlora flexicosta Warren Sri Lanka
Idiochlora ussuriana (Bremer, 1864) south-eastern Siberia, Japan
Idiochlora xanthochlora Swinhoe northern India
Idiochlora pudentifimbria (Prout, 1912) north-eastern Himalayas, Peninsular Malaysia, Borneo
Idiochlora mundaria Leech China
Idiochlora planata Prout Himalayas
Idiochlora celataria (Walker, 1866) Sulawesi, Borneo, ?Sumatra, Peninsular Malaysia, Seram, Kei, New Guinea, Queensland
Idiochlora caudularia Guenée Sri Lanka, southern India
Idiochlora contracta Warren north-eastern Himalayas
Idiochlora androcmes Prout Bali
Idiochlora subtusumbrata Fuchs
Idiochlora subexpressa (Walker, 1861) Borneo, ?Peninsular Malaysia
Idiochlora innotata (Walker, 1861) Borneo, Sumatra
Idiochlora olivata (Warren, 1897) Borneo, Peninsular Malaysia (Penang)
Idiochlora berwicki (Holloway, 1976) Borneo
Idiochlora stictogramma (Prout, 1932) Borneo
Idiochlora stictogrammoides Holloway, 1996 Borneo

References

Hemitheini